M. alba  may refer to:
 Morus alba, the white mulberry, a short-lived, fast-growing, small to medium-sized mulberry tree species native to northern China
 Motacilla alba, the white wagtail, a small passerine bird species found in much of Europe, Asia and parts of north Africa

See also
 Alba (disambiguation)